McBee Methodist Church, also known as McBee Chapel, is an octagonal, brick, United Methodist church building on Main Street in Conestee, Greenville County, South Carolina. Built in 1856, it was designed by millwright John Adams and named for Vardry McBee (1775–1864), the "Father of Greenville," whose son donated the money to build it. The church was built with a balcony used by slaves. When the balcony was removed sometime following the Civil War, its separate door, to the left of the main entrance, was converted into another window.

The church was added to the National Register of Historic Places on March 23, 1972.

References

External links

 Waymarking page for McBee Chapel
 McBee Chapel Historical Marker
 McBee Chapel in Braymer Missouri started by family members

Churches on the National Register of Historic Places in South Carolina
Octagonal churches in the United States
Churches in Greenville County, South Carolina
Methodist churches in South Carolina
National Register of Historic Places in Greenville County, South Carolina